Snow Harp is a cross-country skiing venue located in Hakuba, Nagano, Japan. For the 1998 Winter Olympics, the venue hosted the cross-country skiing and the cross-country skiing portion of the Nordic combined events.

Completed in 1996, test events were held in 1997. It hosted 12 events during the 1998 Games, the most of any venue.

References
1998 Winter Olympics official report. Volume 2. pp. 198–202.
Hakuba-Nagano venue profile.
Shinmai.co.jp 1998 Winter Olympics profile.
Snowjapan.com profile.

Venues of the 1998 Winter Olympics
Olympic cross-country skiing venues
Olympic Nordic combined venues
Ski areas and resorts in Japan
Sports venues in Nagano Prefecture